TightVent Europe is a platform, formed in 2011, with a focus on building and ductwork airtightness issues.  The creation of the platform was triggered by the need for a strong and concerted initiative to meet the Directive on the energy performance of buildings ambitious targets for the year 2020  and overcome the challenges in relation to the envelope and ductwork leakage towards the generalization of nearly zero-energy buildings. The platform’s main activities, among others, include the production and dissemination of policy oriented publications, networking among local or national airtightness associations, as well as the organization of conferences, workshops and webinars.

History 

TightVent Europe was launched and initiated in January 2011 by INIVE EEIG (International Network for Information on Ventilation and Energy Performance), a registered European Economic Interest Grouping (EEIG) whose members include building research centres in Europe. Since then, the platform has received the financial and/or technical support from its partners: ACIN instrumenten, BlowerDoor GmbH, Buildings Performance Institute Europe, dooApp, Eurima, Industrias Gonal, Lindab, MEZ-TECHNIK, Retrotec, Soudal and SIGA.

TightVent Airtightness Associations Committee-TAAC
In September 2012, TightVent Europe launched the TightVent Airtightness Associations Committee (TightVent TAAC committee) with the primary goal to promote reliable testing and reporting procedures. At present, the participants are from Belgium, Canada, Czech Republic, Denmark, Estonia, France, Germany, Hungary, Ireland, Latvia, Lithuania, Netherlands, Poland, Portugal, Spain, Sweden, Switzerland, UK and the USA. The scope of this committee includes various aspects such as:
 airtightness and ventilation inspection requirements in the countries involved
 competent tester/inspectors schemes in the countries involved
 applicable standards and guidelines for testing/inspecting
 collection of relevant guidance and training documents
 knowledge and experience sharing during the meetings
 providing information on ongoing research work in the building and ductwork airtightness and ventilation inspection fields

Publications
Since 2011, TightVent Europe has published 6 reports  in the fields of building and ductwork airtightness. The first publication on the challenges for building and ductwork airtightness was released in 2011 entitled as: “Critical steps for a wide scale implementation of building and ductwork airtightness”. It included an introductory paper browsing the issues of concern and collect a series of technical documents, namely those produced within the ASIEPI project as well as within the SAVE-DUCT and AIRWAYS projects. Another publication: “Methods and techniques for airtight buildings” was released in 2012, with an overview to the design principles and construction methods for building airtightness. Moreover, the publication: "Building air leakage databases in energy conservation policies: Analysis of selected initiatives in 4 European countries and the USA" was also released in 2012 with information on existing envelope air leakage databases from five countries: Czech Republic, France, Germany, UK and USA. Furthermore,another report was produced in close collaboration with the AIVC, "Building airtightness: a critical review of testing reporting and quality schemes in 10 countries", in 2012; a review of testing and reporting about building airtightness and quality management issues for achieving a good airtightness in 10 countries .In 2013, TightVent Europe published "Building and ductwork airtightness: Selected papers from the REHVA special journal issue on ‘airtightness’"  composed of relevant contributions from the special issue on airtightness of the REHVA journal.

Newsletter
TightVent Europe publishes a biannual newsletter with up to date information on developments in respect to building and ductwork airtightness, including policy issues, publications, events, innovative technologies, case studies and research activities.

References

External links
 TightVent October 2022 conference
 TAAC website

Heating, ventilation, and air conditioning
Ventilation
Energy conservation
Low-energy building